'Abd al-Karīm ibn Hawazin Abū al-Qāsim al-Qushayrī al-Naysābūrī (986 – 30 December 1072) was an Arab Muslim scholar and theologian known for his works on Sufism. He was born in Nishapur which is in Khorasan Province in Iran. This region was widely known as a center of  Islamic civilization up to the 13th Century CE. He was the grandfather of the scholar Abd al-Ghafir al-Farsi, a contemporary of Al Ghazali.

Biography
Al Qushayri was born into a privileged Arab family from among the Banu Qushayr who had settled near Nishapur. As a young man he received the education of a country squire of the time: adab, the Arabic language, chivalry and weaponry (istiʿmāl al-silāḥ), but that all changed when he journeyed to the city of Nishapur and was introduced to the Sufi shaykh Abū ʿAlī al-Daqqāq. Daqqāq later became the master and teacher of the mystical ways to Qushayri. He later married the daughter of Daqqāq, Fatima. After the death of Daqqāq, Qushayri became the successor of his master and father-in-law and became the leader of mystic assemblies in the madrasa that Abu Ali al-Daqqāq built in 1001 CE, which later became known as al-Madrasa al-Qushayriyya or "the school of the Qushayri family". In later years Qushayri performed the pilgrimage in the company of Abū Muḥammad al-Juwaynī (d. 438/1047), the father of Imam al-Haramayn al-Juwayni, as well as traveling to Baghdad and the Hijaz. During these travels he heard Hadith from various prominent Hadith scholars. Upon his return he began teaching Hadith, which is something he is famous for. He returned to Baghdad where the Caliph al-Qa'im had him perform hadith teachings in his palace. After his return to Khurāsān, political unrest in the region between the Ḥanafī and Ashʿarī-Shāfiʿī factions in the city forced him to leave Nishapur, but he was eventually able to return and lived there until his death in 1072/465, when the Seljuq vizier Nizam al-Mulk re-established the balance of power between the Ḥanafīs and the Shāfiʿīs. He left behind six sons and several daughters between Fatima and his second wife and was buried near al-Madrasa al-Qushayriyya, next to his father in-law Abū ʿAlī al-Daqqāq

Work
Laṭā'if al-Isharat bi-Tafsīr al-Qur'ān is a famous work of al-Qushayri that is a complete commentary of the Qur'an. He determined that there were four levels of meaning in the Qur'an. First, the ibara which is the meaning of the text meant for the mass of believers. Second, the ishara, only available to the spiritual elite and lying beyond the obvious verbal meaning. Third, laṭā’if, subtleties in the text that were meant particularly for saints. And finally, the ḥaqā’iq, which he said were only comprehensible to the prophets.  This text placed him among the elite of the Sufi mystics and is widely used as a standard of Sufi thought.

His fame however, is due mostly to his al-Risala al-Qushayriyya (or the Epistle on Sufism). This text is essentially a reminder to the people of his era that Sufis had authentic ancestral tradition, as well as a defence of Sufism against the doubters that rose during that time of his life. Al-Qushayri repeatedly acknowledges his debt to, and admiration for, his
Sufi master throughout his Risala. Daqqaq was instrumental in introducing Qushayri to another outstanding Sufi authority of Khurasan, Muhammad bin Husayn al-Sulami, who is quoted on almost every page of the Risala. It has sections where al-Qushayrī discusses the creed of the Sufis, mentions important and influential Sufis from the past, and establishes fundamentals of Sufi terminology, giving his own interpretation of those Sufi terms. Al-Qushayrī finally goes through specific practices of Sufism and the techniques of those practices. This text has been used by many Sufi saints in later times as a standard, as is obvious from the many translations into numerous languages.

Before 1072, al-Qushayri wrote an account of the Night Journey entitled Kitāb al-miʿrāj.

See also

 List of Sufis
 List of Ash'aris and Maturidis
 List of Muslim theologians
 List of Iranian scientists and scholars
 Tassawwuf

References

7. * Chopra, R. M., "SUFISM", 2016, Anuradha Prakashan, New Delhi. .
 Encyclopedia Islam

External links

 Book market
  Biography of Imam Al Qushayri by at-tawhid.net

Asharis
Shafi'is
Sunni Sufis
Sufi mystics
Sufis from Nishapur
11th-century Muslim theologians
Sunni imams
Sunni Muslim scholars of Islam
11th-century Arabs
986 births
1072 deaths
Banu 'Amir